Joy Louise Johnson is the 10th President and Vice-Chancellor of Simon Fraser University in Burnaby, British Columbia, Canada. A health scientist and researcher in gender and health, she became the first woman to be appointed Vice-President Research at Simon Fraser in 2014.

Academic work and life 
Johnson graduated with a Ph.D. degree in Nursing from the University of Alberta in 1993. She worked as a nurse at St. Paul's Hospital and other facilities before returning to graduate school.

From 2003 to 2007, she was the University of British Columbia (UBC) Unit Director, Centre for Addictions Research of BC. From 2008 to 2014, she was the Scientific Director for the Institute of Gender and Health of the Canadian Institutes of Health Research. Johnson held a professorship in the University of British Columbia, School of Nursing, with a focus on health promotion and health behaviour change. Johnson served on the boards of the Women's Health Research Institute, the Michael Smith Foundation for Health Research, and Innovate BC.

In 2014, she became Simon Fraser University's first female Vice President of Research, succeeding Mario Pinto. In 2020, she was appointed to succeed Andrew Petter as President of the university.

Research program 
Johnson’s research program is geared toward promoting health and modifying health-related behaviour. In particular, women and men exhibit different health behaviours and react differently to drugs and other therapies. Medical devices or other equipment physically fit the sexes differently. Ignoring these differences compromises treatment quality.

One reason for ignoring sex differences in drug therapies, for example, is the standard of controlling for extraneous variables such as hormones. This is done in order to attribute health changes to the drug being tested. Because female hormones fluctuate more than do males’, experiments typically use male subjects. This results in comparatively little data about how women respond to the same drug therapies, which compromises women’s health.

Recognition 
 2006 – UBC Killam Research Award which are awarded annually to top campus researchers in recognition of outstanding research and scholarly contributions of international significance.
 2010 – Named one of The Vancouver Sun's BC's 100 Women of Influence for her work in health behaviour.
 2012 – Queen Elizabeth II Diamond Jubilee Medal.
 2019 – Fellow of the Royal Society of Canada.
 Fellow of the Canadian Academy of Health Sciences

Selected publications 
 Haines-Saah, R. J., Johnson, J. L., Repta, R., & Ostry, A. (2014). The privileged normalization of marijuana use – an analysis of Canadian newspaper reporting, 1997–2007. Critical Public Health, 24(1), 47–61. 
 Maggi, S., Lovato, C. Y., Hill, E. M., & Johnson, J. L. (2014). Adolescents’ Perceptions of Parental Influences on Their Smoking Behavior: A Content Analysis. Youth and Society, 46(1), 132.
 Moffat, B. M., Jenkins, E. K., & Johnson, J. L. (2013). Weeding out the information: an ethnographic approach to exploring how young people make sense of the evidence on cannabis. Harm Reduction Journal, 10(1), 34.
 Tarlier, D. S., Johnson, J. L., Browne, A. J., & Sheps, S. (2013). Maternal-Infant Health Outcomes and Nursing Practice in a Remote First Nations Community in Northern Canada. Canadian Journal of Nursing Research, 45(2), 1.
 Bottorff, J. L., Oliffe, J. L., Kelly, M. T., & Johnson, J. L. (2013). Reconciling Parenting and Smoking in the Context of Child Development. Qualitative Health Research, 23(8), 1042.
 Johnson, J. L. (1996). A dialectical analysis concerning the rational aspect of the art of nursing. Image: The Journal of Nursing Scholarship, 28, 169-175.
 Johnson, J. L. (1996). The perceptual aspect of nursing art: Sources of accord and discord. Scholarly Inquiry for Nursing Practice, 10, 307-322.
 Johnson, J. L., Green, L. W., Frankish, C. J., Maclean, D. R., & Stachenko, S. (1996). A dissemination research agenda to strengthen health promotion and disease prevention. Canadian Journal of Public Health, 87(supp. 2), S5-S10.
 Johnson, J. L., Ratner, P. A., & Bottorff, J. L. (1995). Urban-rural differences in the health-promoting behaviours of Albertans. Canadian Journal of Public Health, 86, 103-108.
 Johnson, J. L., & Morse, J. M. (1990). Regaining control: The process of adjustment after myocardial infarction. Heart and Lung, 19, 126-135.
 Johnson, J. L. (1991). Nursing science: Basic, applied or practical? Implications for the art of nursing. Advances in Nursing Science, 14(1), 7-16. [Reprinted in: Johnson, J. L. (1996). Nursing science: Basic, applied or practical? Implications for the art of nursing. In J. W. Kenney (Ed.), Philosophical and theoretical perspectives for advanced nursing practice (pp. 101–109). Sudbury, MA: Jones and Bartlett
 Johnson, J. L., Ratner, P. A., Bottorff, J. L., & Hayduk, L. A. (1993). An exploration of Pender's Health Promotion Model using LISREL. Nursing Research, 42, 132-128.
 Johnson, J. L., Budz, B., Mackay, M., & Miller, C. (1999). Evaluation of a nurse-delivered smoking cessation intervention for hospitalized cardiac patients. Heart and Lung, 28, 55-64.
 Johnson, J. L., Bottorff, J. L., Balneaves, L., Grewal, S., Bhagat, R., Hilton B. A., & Clarke, H. (1999). South Asian women’s views on the causes of breast cancer: Images and explanations. Patient Education and Counseling, 37, 243-254.

References

External links 
 

Living people
Year of birth missing (living people)
Canadian medical researchers
Canadian nurses
Canadian women nurses
Canadian women scientists
Nursing researchers
Academic staff of Simon Fraser University
University of Alberta alumni
Academic staff of the University of British Columbia
Women academic administrators
Women medical researchers
Canadian academic administrators
University of British Columbia Faculty of Applied Science alumni